The 2019 Pakistan Super League Final was a Twenty20 cricket match, played on 17 March 2019 at the National Stadium in Karachi, Pakistan to determine the winner of the 2019 Pakistan Super League. It ended as Quetta Gladiators defeated Peshawar Zalmi by 8 wickets to win their first title. Mohammad Hasnain was awarded man of the match award.

Some 20 percent of the tickets for the final were sold online on 20 February 2019. While the rest of the tickets were sold starting from 25 February 2019 at TCS Courier centers.

Route to the Final
During the group stage of the 2019 Pakistan Super League each team played ten matches, two against each of the other sides contesting the competition. 26 matches were played in the United Arab Emirates while 7 matches were played in Karachi. The top four teams progressed to the playoff stage. Peshawar Zalmi and Quetta Gladiator finished the group stage with first and second position respectively by winning seven of their matches and losing three. Peshawar came on top because of the higher run rate.

League stage matches

Playoff matches

Qualifier

Eliminators

Eliminator 1

Eliminator 2

Match
The final match was played between Quetta Gladiators and Peshawar Zalmi in a packed 32,000 capacity National Stadium, Karachi, Pakistan.

Report
Quetta Gladiators won the toss and elected to field. In the first innings, Peshawar Zalmi's openers Imam-ul-Haq and Kamran Akmal were out early-on, for 3 runs off 4 balls at 1.3 overs and for 21 runs off 15 balls at the end of the fourth over, respectively. Following which Sohaib Maqsood, added 31 runs for the third wicket with Umar Amin before getting caught at long off scoring run-a-ball 20. Amin, the top scorer for his side, was caught out at deep mid-wicket after making 38 runs off 33 balls. Nabi Gul was caught out at 14.4 overs for 9 runs off 12 balls. Kieron Pollard was caught behind for seven off 12 balls. Later, Darren Sammy and Wahab Riaz added 28 runs for the seventh wicket. Zalmi scored 138-8 in 20 overs batting first with Quetta Gladiators' pacer Mohammad Hasnain finishing his four overs with the figures of 3-30 and Dwayne Bravo finishing with 2-24.

In the second innings, Quetta Gladiators' Ahmed Shehzad, who scored 58 runs not out off 51-balls and Ahsan Ali, who scored a 18-ball 25 added 47 for the second wicket after opener Shane Watson was run out for seven runs in the third over. Shehzad's unbroken partnership of 73 runs for the third wicket with Rilee Rossouw who made 39 not out off 32 balls, helped Gladiators achieve the target in 17.5 overs. Rossouw took the winning single. Thus, Gladiators won their maiden PSL title by beating Zalmi by eight wickets. Hasnain was named the man-of-the-match.

Scorecard

keys:
 indicates team captain
 * indicates not out

Toss: Quetta Gladiators won the toss and elected to field.

|colspan="4"|Extras (lb 8, w 2)Total 138/8 (20 overs)
|13
|3
|6.9 RR

Fall of wickets: 4/1 (Imam-ul-Haq, 1.3 ov), 31/2 (Kamran Akmal, 3.6 ov), 62/3 (Sohaib Maqsood, 9.3 ov), 90/4 (Umar Amin, 13.1 ov), 96/5 (Nabi Gul, 14.4 ov), 110/6 (KA Pollard, 16.6 ov), 138/7 (Wahab Riaz, 19.5 ov), 138/8 (Daren Sammy, 20 ov)

Target: 139 runs from 20 overs at 6.95 RR

|colspan="4"|Extras (lb 5, w 5)Total 139/2 (17.5 overs)
|15
|2
|7.79 RR

Fall of wickets: 19/1 (Watson, 2.4 ov), 64/2 (Ahsan Ali, 7.4 ov)

Result: Quetta Gladiator won by 8 wickets.

Match Officials

References

 

Super League Final
2019 in Sindh
Final
2010s in Karachi
Cricket in Karachi
March 2019 sports events in Pakistan
2019